Abdelaziz Adam Al-Hilu (born 7 July 1954) is a Sudanese politician and the current chairperson of the Sudan People's Liberation Army - SPLA-North.

Biography
Al-Hilu was born in Al-Faydh Umm Abdullah, South Kordofan. He is considered one of the most successful SPLA/M commanders in the history of the SPLA and worked with South Sudan's Leader John Garang in an aim to create a Sudan that is democratic, fair and free to all Sudanese population.

He was born, raised and educated in the Nuba Mountains. He studied Economics in the University of Khartoum, and graduated in 1979. He lost the election for governor of South Kordofan to Ahmed Haroun in a poll rejected by the SPLA as rigged. He had been fighting the Sudan People's Armed Forces in the South Kordofan conflict.

Following the Sudanese Revolution, he declared a temporary unilateral ceasefire "to give the ongoing peace talks an opportunity for success", which was later further extended, during which he reached an agreement with the transitional government to separate religion and state and not discriminate against anyone's ethnicity on 3 September 2020. He has also called to remove former President Omar al-Bashir's militias and to reorganize the Sudanese military, in addition to self-determination in areas controlled by his faction.

On 28 March 2021, Al-Hilu signed a peace agreement with the Sudanese government in Juba, South Sudan, in which it would pave the path to establish a civil, democratic federal state in Sudan, in addition to guaranteeing freedom of religion and having a single army to protect national security.

See also
 Nuba Mountains

References

1954 births
Living people
University of Khartoum alumni
People from South Kordofan
Sudan People's Liberation Movement politicians